Anopinella rotunda is a species of moth of the family Tortricidae. It is found in Peru.

The wingspan is 22 mm. The ground colour of the forewings is brownish cream, cream in the costal third postbasally and mixed with rust dorsally. It is slightly tinged greyish terminally. The hindwings are dark and brown.

Etymology
The species name refers to the shape of the end of the valve and is derived from Latin rotunda (meaning rounded).

References

Moths described in 2010
Anopinella
Moths of South America
Taxa named by Józef Razowski